Wren is an unincorporated community in Lawrence County, Alabama, United States.

History
The community is named for the Wren family, who lived in the area. A post office operated under the name Wren from 1896 to 1906.

References

Unincorporated communities in Lawrence County, Alabama
Unincorporated communities in Alabama